

Major events
December 3 (November 22 in the Julian calendar), 1717 — Astrakhan Governorate was formed on the southern lands of Kazan Governorate.
December 3 (November 22), 1717 — Nizhny Novgorod Governorate abolished; its territory merged with Kazan Governorate.

Subdivisions (as of 1718)
Archangelgorod Governorate (Архангелогородская губерния)
Subdivided into 18.5 lots.
Astrakhan Governorate (Астраханская губерния)
Subdivided into lots.
Azov Governorate (Азовская губерния)
Subdivided into 7.5 lots.
Kazan Governorate (Казанская губерния)
Subdivided into lots.
Kiev Governorate (Киевская губерния)
Subdivided into 5 lots.
Moscow Governorate (Московская губерния)
Subdivided into lots.
Riga Governorate (Рижская губерния)
Subdivided into lots.
St. Petersburg Governorate (Санкт-Петербургская губерния)
Subdivided into 32.2 lots.
Siberian Governorate (Сибирская губерния)
Subdivided into 9 lots.

1717-1719
1710s in Russia